The Lehtovaara PIK-16 Vasama is a Finnish mid-wing, single-seat, FAI Standard Class glider that was designed by Tuomo Tervo, Jorma Jalkanen and Kurt Hedstrom, who were students at the Polyteknikkojen Ilmailukerho (PIK) and produced by Lehtovaara.

Design and development
The PIK-16 is constructed from wood, with a fibreglass nose. The  span wing employs a Wortmann FX-05-168 (14% modification) airfoil at the wing root, transitioning to a NACA 63 (2)-165 at the wing tip. The wing features dive brakes. The prototype Vasama had V tail, but it was changed to cruciform tail on production aircraft.

A total of 56 PIK-16s were built. The aircraft was not type certified but it did become the second most exported Finnish glider, surpassed only by the later PIK-20 series.

Operational history
The prototype PIK-16 set a Finnish national record for a  triangle course of  before it had even finished flight testing.

The design won the OSTIV prize at the World Gliding Championships held at Junín, Buenos Aires Province, Argentina in 1963, finishing third in the standard class.

Variants
PIK-16a
Prototype with a V-tail.
PIK-16b
Revised design with a cruciform tail, four built by the Finnish Aeronautical Association at the Jämi Flying School.
PIK-16c
Third version

Aircraft on display
Finnish Aviation Museum

Specifications (Pik-16 Vasama)

See also

References

Citations

Bibliography

1960s Finnish sailplanes
PIK aircraft
Aircraft first flown in 1961
Mid-wing aircraft